Edward Pasewicz (born 9 June 1971) is a Polish writer, poet and composer. Laureate of VIII edition of Ogólnopolski Konkurs Poetycki im. Jacka Bierezina (2000). In 2007, he was nominated to Gdynia Literary Prize for a book Henry Berryman Pięśni. His poems were translated into several languages: German, English, Czech, Bulgarian, Slovenian, Serbian, Italian, Spanish, Catalan, Ukrainian and Russian. In 2011 he was granted a scholarship from Ministry of Culture and National Heritage (Poland). In 2022, he was awarded the Angelus Award for his novel Pulverkopf.

He is Buddhist, learner of Ole Nydahl. Since 2011, he has been a director of "Scena 21" in Cracow, Poland.  He has been living in Cracow, Poland since July 2010.

Bibliography

 Dolna Wilda (Anima, Tygiel Kultury 2001; Poznań, Wielkopolska Biblioteka Poetów 2006)
 Nauki dla żebraków (added to magazine "Topos" nr 4-5/2003)
 Wiersze dla Róży Filipowicz (Wrocław, Biuro Literackie 2004)
 th (Kielce, kserokopia.art.pl 2005)
 Henry Berryman Pięśni (Kielce, kserokopia.art.pl 2006)
 Śmierć w darkroomie (Kraków, EMG 2007)
 Drobne! Drobne! (Poznań, WBPiCAK 2008)
 Muzyka na instrumenty strunowe, perkusję i czelestę (Poznań, WBPICAK 2010, Wielkopolska Biblioteka Poezji tom 20)
 Pałacyk Bertolta Brechta (Kraków, EMG 2011)
 Lamentacje Londyńskie
 Trzej Bracia
 Zero jeden
 Putinka
 Czynny do odwołania

References

External links
 
 

Polish male writers
Polish poets
Polish composers
1971 births
Living people
Polish Buddhists
People from Kostrzyn nad Odrą